Robert E. Lloyd (born October 5, 1945) is an American former professional basketball player in the American Basketball Association (ABA), even though he was drafted by the NBA's Detroit Pistons in the 7th round of the 1967 NBA draft. Lloyd began his ABA career with the New Jersey Americans; the team became the New York Nets in 1968 (and is now the NBA's Brooklyn Nets). In two ABA seasons, Lloyd scored 1,127 points in his career, good for a 9.0 points per game average.

At Rutgers University, Lloyd became the Scarlet Knights' first ever First Team All-American. He still holds the school record for career scoring average (26.5 ppg), and as a senior in 1966–67 he led NCAA Division I in free throw percentage (.921), making 255-of-277 attempts. Also in that season, Lloyd coupled with fellow guard and college roommate Jim Valvano to lead Rutgers to their first-ever postseason basketball tournament, the 1967 National Invitation Tournament, where they defeated University of New Mexico 65–60 to reach the Final Four of the tournament.  They defeated Marshall 93–76 in the third place game, after losing to Walt Frazier's Southern Illinois Salukis. In 1987, Lloyd became the first Rutgers athlete to have his jersey retired.

After basketball, Lloyd went on to become a successful businessman. He was the president and CEO of Data East, Incorporated before becoming the chairman and CEO of Mindscape, a publisher of consumer software. Since 1994, he has served as chairman of the board for The V Foundation For Cancer Research, which was started by his friend and teammate Jim Valvano as he was battling cancer which ultimately claimed his life. Lloyd has helped raise over $70 million since that time. Today, Lloyd is retired besides his work at The V Foundation and resides in Los Altos Hills, California.

References

1946 births
Living people
All-American college men's basketball players
American men's basketball players
Basketball players from New Jersey
Basketball players from Pennsylvania
Detroit Pistons draft picks
New Jersey Americans players
New York Nets players
People from Los Altos Hills, California
People from Upper Darby Township, Pennsylvania
Point guards
Rutgers Scarlet Knights men's basketball players
Sportspeople from Delaware County, Pennsylvania